Campaign to Suppress Bandits in Longquan was a counter-guerrilla / counterinsurgency campaign the communists fought against the nationalist guerrilla that was mostly consisted of bandits and nationalist regular troops left behind after the nationalist government withdrew from mainland China. The campaign was part of the Campaign to Suppress Bandits in Northwestern China, and resulted in communist victory.

Strategies
The nationalists had faced a precarious dilemma in waging the campaign against its communist enemy because of complex situation they had faced, and consequently, made several grave miscalculations which contributed to their eventual failure.

Nationalist miscalculations
Like other nationalist futile attempts to fight guerrilla and insurgency warfare against the communists after being driven off from mainland China, the very first grave strategic miscalculation made by the retreating nationalist government contributed at least equally if not greater than the enemy's political and military pressure to the nationalist defeat in this campaign.  The very first strategic miscalculation made by the retreating nationalist government was identical to the earlier one the nationalist government had made immediately after World War II, when it had neither the sufficient troops nor enough transportation assets to be deployed into the Japanese-occupied regions of China, and unwilling to let these regions falling into communist hands, the nationalist government ordered the Japanese and their turncoat Chinese puppet government not to surrender to the communists and allowed them to keep their fighting capabilities to "maintain order" in the Japanese occupied regions by fighting off the communists.  This earlier miscalculation resulted in further alienation and resentment to the nationalist government by the local population, which had already blamed the nationalists for losing the regions to the Japanese invaders during the war.  Half a decade later when the nationalists were driven from mainland China, they had made the similar miscalculation once again in their desperation, this time by enlisting the help of local bandits to fight the communists, and ordering the nationalist troops left behind to join these bandits in the struggle against the communism.  However, the bandits were deeply feared and hated by the local populace they plagued for so long, and nationalist troops left behind joining the bandits certainly did not help them win the support of the general population.  In fact, it served the exact opposite, strengthening the popular support of their communist enemy.

The second grave strategic miscalculation made by the retreating nationalist government was also similar to the one the nationalist government had made immediately after World War II, when it attempted to simultaneously solve the warlord problem that had plagued China for so long with the problem of the exterminating communists together: those warlords allied with Chiang Kai-shek's nationalist government were only interested in keeping their own power and defected to the Japanese side when Japanese invaders offered to let them keep their power in exchange for their collaborations.  After World War II, these forces of former Japanese puppet governments once again returned to the nationalist camp for the same reason they defected to the Japanese invaders. Obviously, it was difficult for Chiang to immediately get rid of these warlords for good as soon as they surrendered to Chiang and rejoined nationalists, because such move would alienate other factions within the nationalist ranks, and those former Japanese puppet government's warlords could still help the nationalists to by holding on to what was under their control and fighting off communists, and they and the communists would both be weakened.  Similarly, the bandits the nationalist governments had failed to exterminate were obviously not good candidates for evacuation to Taiwan half a decade later, and using them to fight communists appeared to be the only logical alternative.  If the communists were great weakened by the bandits, then it would the nationalists would have easier time in their counterattacks to retake China.  If the bandits were defeated, then the nationalists would have easier job to eradicate them later after retaking China.  However, just like those warlords, these bandits were only interested in keeping their own power also, and thus did not put any real efforts to fight the communists like some of the nationalists who were dedicated to their political cause.  The eradication of bandits by the communist government only strengthened its popular support since previous governments (including the nationalist government itself) dating back from Qing Dynasty had failed to do so.

The third grave strategic miscalculation made by the retreating nationalist government was similar to the second one, but this one was about its own troops left behind.  The nationalist government had faced a dilemma: the highly disciplined troops were in desperate need to defend Taiwan, the last nationalist island sanctuary.  The less disciplined second rate and undisciplined third rate troops, both of which mostly consisted of warlords' troop were definitely not suited to be withdrawn to defend the last stand nationalists had made, and they were not given the top priority for evacuation.  Instead, they were left behind to fight the communists behind the enemy line, but such move had alienated many of the troops left behind, and it was impossible to expect them to fight their communist enemy with the same kind of dedication like those nationalist agents who believed in their political cause.  Compounding the problem, due to the need of bandits' knowledge of local area, they were often rewarded with higher ranks than the nationalist troops left behind.  As a result, the former-nationalist regular troops turned guerrilla fighters lacked any willingness to work together with the bandits they once attempted to exterminate, especially when many of the bandits had killed their comrades-in-arms earlier in the battles of eradications / pacifications.  Many loyal nationalists were enraged by the fact that they had to serve under the former-enemy they once fought.  Similarly, the bandits lacked the similar willingness and attempted to expend those nationalist troops whenever they could in order to save their own skin.

The fourth grave strategic miscalculation made by the retreating nationalist government was financial / economical: due to the lack of money, those bandits turned guerrillas were mostly provided with arms, but not sufficient supplies and money.  The bandits turned guerrilla had no problem of looting the local population to get what they need, as they had done for decades, which inevitably drove the general popular support further into the communist side.  The little financial support provided by the nationalist government was simply not enough to support such guerrilla and insurgency warfare on such a large scale.  Another unexpected but disastrous result of the insufficient financial support was that it had greatly eroded the support of the nationalist government within its own ranks.  The wealthy landowners and businessmen were the strong supporters of nationalist government and as their properties were confiscated by the communists and redistributed to the poor, their hatred toward the communist government was enough to cause many of them to stay behind voluntarily to fight behind the enemy line.  However, the landowners and businessmen were also longtime victims of bandits due to their wealth, and many of them had suffered even more than the general populace who had far less wealth.  As these former landowners and businessmen turned guerrilla fighters were ordered to join their former bandits who once threatened, looted, kidnapped and even killed them and their relatives, it was obvious that such cooperation was mostly in name only and could not produce any actual benefits, and the alienation and discontent toward the nationalist government harbored by these once ardent nationalists would only grow greater.

Another problem for the nationalists was the strong disagreement among themselves over how to fight the war against their communist enemy.  Military professionals preferred to fight a total war, incapacitate the enemy's ability to fight, but this inevitably conflicted with the interest of another faction of strong supporters of the nationalist government: the landowners and businessmen, who joined bandits to oppose such tactic.  The reason was that landowners and businessmen supporting and joining the nationalist guerrilla firmly believed that the nationalists would be able to retake mainland China within several years and they would be able to regain their lost lands, businesses, and other properties that were confiscated and redistributed to the poor by the communists.  As the nationalist military professionals in the guerrilla suggested and destroyed the production facilities and businesses as part of the total war, the landowners and businessmen would not be able to regain any valuable properties after the return of the nationalist government because those properties had been destroyed.  The bandits agreed with the businessmen and landowners to oppose the idea of total war for a different reason: when the properties were destroyed and productivity dropped, they would not be able to loot enough supply to survive.  As a result, despite the animosities between the bandits and landowners and businessmen, they were united together in the opposition to the military professional faction of the nationalists.

Communist strategies
In contrast to the nationalists, communists had a much simpler but effective strategy because the communists did not have the dilemma the nationalists had, all they had to do was to eradicate bandits. The job of fighting a counterinsurgency and counter guerrilla war was made much easier for the communists by the grave strategic miscalculations nationalists had made themselves, and the communists exploited these to their maximum advantage.  As with all other bandit eradication campaigns fought at the time, the most important communist strategy was to mobilize the entire population to fight the bandits, and furthermore, additional strategies were devised specifically to fit the local situation to fight the bandits.

Order of battle
Nationalists
Sichuan – Xikang People's Anti-communist National Salvation Army 1st Column
Communists
87th Regiment
2 Battalions of Chengdu Garrison Regiment
2 Battalions of Western Sichuan Military Sub-region
 Longquanyi District (garrison) Squadron

Initial stage
As nationalist government withdrew from western Sichuan to escape advancing communists, it ordered its forces left behind to join the local bandits to wage a guerrilla war against the communist enemy.  Additional nationalist agents and military professionals were sent to join bandits as military advisors. To fight their common communist enemy, local bandits, and bodyguards of landlords and opium drug lords set aside their long term hostilities toward each other and managed to form an unlikely alliance united under the fleeing nationalist government, organized as Sichuan – Xikang People's Anti-communist National Salvation Army 1st Column, commanded by bandit chieftain Ma Li (马力).  The second most powerful force of the local nationalist support came from landlord Liu Hui'an (刘惠安), whose personal army totaled over five hundred.  With other bandits in regions of Jianyang, Sichuan and Huayang (华阳), the nationalist guerrilla totaled over ten thousands, and agreed to carry out the large scale attack on the enemy planned by the nationalist government, codenamed as March 3 Riot, after the planned lunar calendar date of March 3, 1950 (Gregorian calendar date of April 19, 1950).  However, the anti-communist alliance was fragile to begin with and due to the traditional longtime hatred toward each other, the alliance members were deeply suspicious and distrustful to each other despite reaching a truce for the sake of against the common communist enemy, and this had gravely hindered their operations.  As a result, most battles were small skirmishes carried out independently by individual bands of bandits, and personal armies of landlords and drug lords.

Before the planned major attack, small attacks on the communists were already carried out, targeting the communist grain gathering teams.  On April 2, 1950, a communist grain gathering team headed by Zhu Xiangli (朱向离) was ambushed and wiped out completely.  On April 14, 1950, a nine-member communist grain gathering squad led by commissar Zhang Xiang (张翔) was captured by bandits headed by Liu Daichang (刘代长) and Liu Daifu (刘代富) at Wanxing (万兴) Township tea plantation, and subsequently executed at the region of Xiachangkou (下场口) of Wanxing township.  The next day, another communist grain gathering squad led by Gu Shusen (顾树森) was ambushed and captured in Jigong (鸡公) Mountain, and all nine members were subsequently executed.  Meanwhile, local drug lords also begun their fight against communists when the biggest local drug lord Liu Chaozhang (刘朝章) was arrested by the communists.  As communist forces were destroying Liu Chaozhang's opium plantation totaled several dozen acres, they were constantly harassed by drug dealers' sniper fire in the process during their drug eradication effort that lasted more than two weeks.  Attacks like these prompted the communists to formally launch a campaign to eradicate bandits in the local area. Although the communists strength was in absolute disadvantage, they were helped greatly by the lack of corporation among bandits themselves.

Battle of Hungtuchang
On April 14, 1950, over a thousand bandits from Ma Li (马力)'s band gathered in the region of Yellow Earth Field (Huangtuchang, 黄土场), and prepared to attack communists. As communists learned the news, they immediately decided to launch a preemptive strike against the nationalist guerrilla despite absolute numerical inferiority.  The 5th Company of the communist 87th Regiment was ordered to proceed to Yellow Earth Field to attack the main body of the bandit force, and the Longquanyi District (garrison) Squadron was ordered to attack nearby Stone Plate Beach (Shibantan, 石板滩) to help.  The battle lasted continuously for two night and two days, and the nationalists were completely surprised by the sudden preemptive strike by their enemy.  The bandits, landlords, and drug lords only wanted to keep their own strength and did not want to sacrifice their own force for the others, and everybody expected others to fight the communist enemy instead.  As a result, different bands of bandits begun to flee from the battlefield almost as soon as the battle begun, and others soon followed.

The flight of bandits from the battlefield begun more rampant when another news reached the battlefield: of thousands bandits active in the region, only a hundred or so came to help fight the communist enemy, while all of the rest did not do anything.  Only bandits under the command of chieftain Zhang Hua (张华) and the nationalist agent Wang Zhongxian (王忠贤) put up some real resistance, but they efforts were futile and they were nearly completely annihilated.  As the main force of bandits were defeated and dispersed, every member of the 100 plus strong bandit reinforcement was also captured alive by the communists.  The communist casualties were surprising low, with only one fatality, the 2nd platoon commander Jiao Lianyu (焦连玉) was killed in action, while other five soldiers were injured.

Battle of Luodai
Although most other bandits in the area did not help those in the battle of the Yellow Earth Field because they did not want to risk themselves for others, they did select another target to strike. As the communist 5th Company of the communist 87th Regiment was ordered to the battle of the Yellow Earth Field from Luodai (洛带), the area it was originally stationed, the only communist presence left behind was a single squad and civilian administrators.  Many bandits believed that this was a great opportunity to attack Luodai due to the weakened defense and they would be successful capturing a lot of supplies.  By April 15, 1950, around five thousand bandits besieged the communist military base / administrative headquarters at Luodai and launched their attack.  The communist defenders proved to be much tougher than expected and even the communist civilian administrators taking up arms fought better than most bandits.

After continuous attacks were beaten back, bandits changed their strategy by attempting to besiege the communist base for longtime, because they were confident that the numerically superior bandit force at the battle of Yellow Earth Field would succeed in wiping out the numerically inferior communist enemy, and the communist defenders of the base would have no choice but to surrender.  Additionally, different bands of bandits were unwilling to sacrifice themselves for others to attack the base again, because if they were killed, they would not be able to share the spoils while others could.  However, by April 17, 1950, the shocking news of the numerically superior bandit force at the battle of the Yellow Earth Field reached Luodai, and bandits were completely dumbfounded that their numerically superior force was completely annihilated.  More bad news followed as the bandits learned that the communist forces at the battle of the Yellow Earth Field consisting of the 5th Company of the 87th Regiment and Longquanyi District (garrison) Squadron were on their way back to help their comrades.  By 9:00 PM on April 17, 1950, they had reached Luodai.  Communists were helped by their reinforcements consisting of two battalions of Western Sichuan Military Sub-region.  After a fierce battle that continuously lasted a day and a night, bandits was completely annihilated and dispersed, and went into hiding as they fled the battlefield.  Following their victory, the communists begun their mopping up operation by combing every single hamlet, and forced bandits to flee from the Luodai to Longquanyi District (referred simply as Longquan by the local populace).

Battle of Longquan
While the battle of Luodai was raging on, several thousand bandits attacked Longquanyi District from two different direction, with one thrust from Baihe (柏合) Township, and another from Ping'an (平安) Township. The local communist garrison only totaled seventy, but there was an armory where mortars stored.  Fifteen minutes after the bandits launched their attack, they were bombarded by mortar fires, which successfully checked the bandits' advance.  The next day, communist reinforcements consisting of two Battalions of Chengdu Garrison Regiments arrived.  Despite absolute numerical inferiority, the communists decided to launch a counterattack on the bandits, correctly deducting that despite enjoying absolute numerical superiority, the bandits would not fight as a cohesive unit because none of them would want to fight and die for others.  Just as it had occurred in the earlier two battles, the bandits behaved exactly as the communists had predicted and despite having five thousands members, the bandits' offensive completely collapsed and every bandit started to immediately flee from the battlefield after suffering only four dozen fatalities, when attacked from both sides.  As the communists begun their mopping up operation at the same night at Baihe Township, all of the seventeen bandits who failed to flee from the area were captured alive by the communists.

The communist victory of the battle of Longquan marked the end of the organized battles in the local area.  Although the mopping up operation would last until end of the year, with another dozen smaller battles to be fought, all of the surviving bandits in the local area were completely eradicated by the end of the year.  Political offensive and pressures from the communists played an important role in their success in that many of the bandits surrendered, and most of them was reeducated, finally switched to the communist side.

Outcome
Although sharing the common anticommunist goal, the nationalist guerrilla and insurgency warfare was largely handicapped by the enlistment of bandits, many of whom had fought and killed nationalist troops earlier in the eradication / pacification campaign, and also looted, kidnapped and even killed landlords and business owners, an important faction that supported the nationalist government, but now must united against the common enemy, which is half-hearted at the best. Compounding the problem further with additional differences within the ranks of the nationalist guerillas themselves, the futile nationalist guerrilla and insurgency warfare against its communist enemy was destined to fail.

See also
List of battles of the Chinese Civil War
National Revolutionary Army
History of the People's Liberation Army
Chinese Civil War

References

Zhu, Zongzhen and Wang, Chaoguang, Liberation War History, 1st Edition, Social Scientific Literary Publishing House in Beijing, 2000,  (set)
Zhang, Ping, History of the Liberation War, 1st Edition, Chinese Youth Publishing House in Beijing, 1987,  (pbk.)
Jie, Lifu, Records of the Liberation War: The Decisive Battle of Two Kinds of Fates, 1st Edition, Hebei People's Publishing House in Shijiazhuang, 1990,  (set)
Literary and Historical Research Committee of the Anhui Committee of the Chinese People's Political Consultative Conference, Liberation War, 1st Edition, Anhui People's Publishing House in Hefei, 1987, 
Li, Zuomin, Heroic Division and Iron Horse: Records of the Liberation War, 1st Edition, Chinese Communist Party History Publishing House in Beijing, 2004, 
Wang, Xingsheng, and Zhang, Jingshan, Chinese Liberation War, 1st Edition, People's Liberation Army Literature and Art Publishing House in Beijing, 2001,  (set)
Huang, Youlan, History of the Chinese People's Liberation War, 1st Edition, Archives Publishing House in Beijing, 1992, 
Liu Wusheng, From Yan'an to Beijing: A Collection of Military Records and Research Publications of Important Campaigns in the Liberation War, 1st Edition, Central Literary Publishing House in Beijing, 1993, 
Tang, Yilu and Bi, Jianzhong, History of Chinese People's Liberation Army in Chinese Liberation War, 1st Edition, Military Scientific Publishing House in Beijing, 1993 – 1997,  (Volume 1), 7800219615 (Volume 2), 7800219631 (Volume 3), 7801370937 (Volume 4), and 7801370953 (Volume 5)

Longquan, campaign to suppress bandits in
1950 in China
Campaigns to Suppress Bandits